The Portuguese local elections of 1993 took place on 12 December. The elections consisted of three separate elections in the 305 Portuguese municipalities, the election for the Municipal Chambers, whose winner is elected mayor, another election for the Municipal Assembly and a last one for the lower-level Parish Assembly, whose winner is elected parish president. This last was held separately in the more than 4,200 parishes around the country.

The Socialist Party (PS) maintained and increased their status as the largest local party. The party won 7 more cities compared with 1989 and, for the first time ever, polled above 40% of the votes. The PS hold on the control of big cities like Lisbon, Porto and Coimbra, and were also able to win two big cities in the Lisbon area from the PSD, Cascais and Sintra.

The Social Democrats (PSD), although winning 2 more cities compared with last time, saw the gap between them and the PS widen, but, at the same, were able to hold onto their ground. The party suffered some losses, like they did in 1989, in the big urban centers but were able to win some cities from the PS like Pombal and Ponta Delgada. The elections happened as Cavaco Silva's government celebrated 8 years in power, and, at the same time Portugal was exiting the early 1990s recession which may have hurt the PSD electoral chances.

The Democratic Unity Coalition (CDU) was able to hold on to their 1989 scores losing just one city and 7 councillors. The coalition between the Communists and the Greens were able to hold on to their bastions of Beja, Évora and Almada. The share of the vote for the CDU was also unchanged compared with 1989.

The People's Party (CDS) was the big loser of the elections. The party lost 7 cities, most of them for the PSD and PS, achieving their worst results till that date as they only won 13 cities out of 305. The party lost many of their bastions like Mirandela or Paredes to the PS or the PSD. The party also achieved their worst share of vote till that time, 8.4%.

Turnout in these elections increased compared with the 1989 election, as 63.4% of the electorate cast a ballot, the best turnout showing since 1982.

Parties 
The main political forces involved in the election were:

 People's Party (CDS)1, 
 Democratic Unity Coalition (CDU)1
 Socialist Party (PS)1
 Social Democratic Party (PSD)

1 The PS formed a coalitions with CDS, CDU and UDP in several municipalities.

Results

Municipal Councils

National summary of votes and seats

|-
! rowspan="2" colspan=2 style="background-color:#E9E9E9" align=left|Parties
! rowspan="2" style="background-color:#E9E9E9" align=right|Votes
! rowspan="2" style="background-color:#E9E9E9" align=right|%
! rowspan="2" style="background-color:#E9E9E9" align=right|±pp swing
! rowspan="2" style="background-color:#E9E9E9" align=right|Candidacies
! colspan="2" style="background-color:#E9E9E9" align="center"|Councillors
! colspan="2" style="background-color:#E9E9E9" align="center"|Mayors
|- style="background-color:#E9E9E9"
! style="background-color:#E9E9E9" align="center"|Total
! style="background-color:#E9E9E9" align="center"|±
! style="background-color:#E9E9E9" align="center"|Total
! style="background-color:#E9E9E9" align="center"|±
|-
| 
|1,953,279||36.10||3.7||||796||68||126||10
|-
| 
|1,824,519||33.72||2.3||||806||26||116||3
|-
| 
|689,923||12.75||0.1||||246||7||49||1
|-
| 
|454,047||8.39||0.7||||135||44||13||7
|-
|style="width: 10px" bgcolor=#FF66FF align="center" | 
|align=left|PS / CDU / UDP / PSR
|200,816||3.71||0.0||||11||2||1||0
|-
|style="width: 10px" bgcolor=#000080 align="center" | 
|align=left|National Solidarity
|28,716||0.53||—||||3||—||0||—
|-
| 
|23,225||0.43||—||||2||—||0||—
|-
| 
|16,090||0.30||0.2||||0||0||0||0
|-
|style="width: 10px" bgcolor=#FF66FF align="center" | 
|align=left|Socialist / People's
|11,435||0.21||0.2||||7||8||0||3
|-
|style="width: 10px" bgcolor=#FF66FF align="center" | 
|align=left|PS / CDU / UDP / PDA
|10,234||0.19||—||||4||—||0||—
|-
|style="width: 10px" bgcolor=#E2062C align="center" | 
|align=left|People's Democratic Union
|8,161||0.15||0.2||||0||4||0||1
|-
| 
|1,456||0.03||0.8||||0||4||0||0
|-
| 
|1,387||0.03||0.2||||1||0||0||0
|-
| 
|287||0.01||0.0||||0||0||0||0
|-
| 
|269||0.00||0.1||||0||1||0||0
|-
| 
|216||0.00||0.1||||0||1||0||0
|-
|style="width: 10px" bgcolor=#FF66FF align="center" | 
|align=left|PS / CDU 
|190||0.00||—||||4||—||0||—
|-
|colspan=2 align=left style="background-color:#E9E9E9"|Total valid
|width="65" align="right" style="background-color:#E9E9E9"|5,223,673
|width="40" align="right" style="background-color:#E9E9E9"|96.54
|width="40" align="right" style="background-color:#E9E9E9"|0.0
|width="40" align="right" style="background-color:#E9E9E9"|—
|width="45" align="right" style="background-color:#E9E9E9"|2,015
|width="45" align="right" style="background-color:#E9E9E9"|13
|width="45" align="right" style="background-color:#E9E9E9"|305
|width="45" align="right" style="background-color:#E9E9E9"|0
|-
|colspan=2|Blank ballots
|103,686||1.92||0.1||colspan=6 rowspan=4|
|-
|colspan=2|Invalid ballots
|83,251||1.54||0.1
|-
|colspan=2 align=left style="background-color:#E9E9E9"|Total
|width="65" align="right" style="background-color:#E9E9E9"|5,410,610
|width="40" align="right" style="background-color:#E9E9E9"|100.00
|width="40" align="right" style="background-color:#E9E9E9"|
|-
|colspan=2|Registered voters/turnout
||8,529,737||63.43||2.5
|-
| colspan=11 align=left | Source: Comissão Nacional de Eleições
|}

Municipality map

City control
The following table lists party control in all district capitals, as well as in municipalities above 100,000 inhabitants. Population estimates from the 1991 Census.

Municipal Assemblies

National summary of votes and seats

|-
! rowspan="2" colspan=2 style="background-color:#E9E9E9" align=left|Parties
! rowspan="2" style="background-color:#E9E9E9" align=right|Votes
! rowspan="2" style="background-color:#E9E9E9" align=right|%
! rowspan="2" style="background-color:#E9E9E9" align=right|±pp swing
! rowspan="2" style="background-color:#E9E9E9" align=right|Candidacies
! colspan="2" style="background-color:#E9E9E9" align="center"|Mandates
|- style="background-color:#E9E9E9"
! style="background-color:#E9E9E9" align="center"|Total
! style="background-color:#E9E9E9" align="center"|±
|- 
| 
|align=right|1,930,816
|align=right|35.70
|align=right|2.5
|align=right|
|align=right|2,629
|align=right|200
|-
| 
|align=right|1,829,087
|align=right|33.82
|align=right|1.3
|align=right|
|align=right|2,671
|align=right|98
|-  
| 
|align=right|704,980 	
|align=right|13.04
|align=right|0.8
|align=right|
|align=right|803
|align=right|46
|-
| 
|align=right|445,065 	
|align=right|8.23
|align=right|1.1
|align=right|
|align=right|556
|align=right|156
|-
|style="width: 10px" bgcolor=#FF66FF align="center" | 
|align=left|PS / CDU / UDP / PSR
|align=right|194,501
|align=right|3.60
|align=right|0.2
|align=right|
|align=right|32
|align=right|9
|-
|style="width: 10px" bgcolor=#000080 align="center" | 
|align=left|National Solidarity
|align=right|23,260
|align=right|0.43
|align=right|—
|align=right|
|align=right|16
|align=right|—
|-
| 
|align=right|22,653
|align=right|0.42
|align=right|—
|align=right|
|align=right|11
|align=right|—
|-
| 
|align=right|12,063  	
|align=right|0.22
|align=right|0.0
|align=right|
|align=right|1
|align=right|1
|-
|style="width: 10px" bgcolor=#FF66FF align="center" | 
|align=left|Socialist / People's
|align=right|11,905
|align=right|0.22
|align=right|0.5
|align=right|
|align=right|24
|align=right|17
|-
|style="width: 10px" bgcolor=#E2062C align="center" | 
|align=left|People's Democratic Union
|align=right|11,009 	
|align=right|0.20
|align=right|0.2
|align=right|
|align=right|2
|align=right|12
|-
|style="width: 10px" bgcolor=#FF66FF align="center" | 
|align=left|PS / CDU / UDP / PDA
|align=right|9,958 	
|align=right| 0.18
|align=right|—
|align=right|
|align=right|11
|align=right|—
|-
| 
|align=right|9,733
|align=right|0.18
|align=right|—
|align=right|
|align=right|0
|align=right|—
|-
| 
|align=right|3,494
|align=right|0.06
|align=right| 0.1
|align=right| 
|align=right| 0
|align=right| 2
|-
| 
|align=right| 1,476
|align=right| 0.03
|align=right|0.9
|align=right|
|align=right|2
|align=right|24
|-
| 
|align=right|1,340
|align=right|0.02
|align=right|0.2
|align=right|
|align=right|4
|align=right|2
|-
|style="width: 10px" bgcolor=#FF66FF align="center" | 
|align=left|PS / CDU 
|align=right| 96
|align=right| 0.00
|align=right|—
|align=right|
|align=right|7
|align=right|—
|-
|colspan=2 align=left style="background-color:#E9E9E9"|Total valid
|width="65" align="right" style="background-color:#E9E9E9"|5,211,436
|width="40" align="right" style="background-color:#E9E9E9"|96.36
|width="40" align="right" style="background-color:#E9E9E9"|0.1
|width="40" align="right" style="background-color:#E9E9E9"|—
|width="45" align="right" style="background-color:#E9E9E9"|6,769
|width="45" align="right" style="background-color:#E9E9E9"|16
|-
|colspan=2|Blank ballots
|111,834||2.07||0.0||colspan=6 rowspan=4|
|-
|colspan=2|Invalid ballots
|85,042||1.57||0.1
|-
|colspan=2 align=left style="background-color:#E9E9E9"|Total
|width="65" align="right" style="background-color:#E9E9E9"|5,408,312
|width="40" align="right" style="background-color:#E9E9E9"|100.00
|width="40" align="right" style="background-color:#E9E9E9"|
|-
|colspan=2|Registered voters/turnout
||8,530,297||63.40||3.6
|-
| colspan=11 align=left | Source: Comissão Nacional de Eleições
|}

Parish Assemblies

National summary of votes and seats

|-
! rowspan="2" colspan=2 style="background-color:#E9E9E9" align=left|Parties
! rowspan="2" style="background-color:#E9E9E9" align=right|Votes
! rowspan="2" style="background-color:#E9E9E9" align=right|%
! rowspan="2" style="background-color:#E9E9E9" align=right|±pp swing
! rowspan="2" style="background-color:#E9E9E9" align=right|Candidacies
! colspan="2" style="background-color:#E9E9E9" align="center"|Mandates
! colspan="2" style="background-color:#E9E9E9" align="center"|Presidents
|- style="background-color:#E9E9E9"
! style="background-color:#E9E9E9" align="center"|Total
! style="background-color:#E9E9E9" align="center"|±
! style="background-color:#E9E9E9" align="center"|Total
! style="background-color:#E9E9E9" align="center"|±
|-
| 
|1,860,188||34.53||2.3||||12,312||1,124||||
|-
| 
|1,810,841||33.62||0.7||||13,679||442||||
|-
| 
|714,001||13.26||0.8||||2,747||177||||
|-
| 
|418,998||7.78||0.6||||2,719||725||||
|-
|style="width: 10px" bgcolor=#FF66FF align="center" | 
|align=left|PS / CDU / UDP / PSR
|199,275||3.70||0.2||||447||55||||
|-
|style="width: 8px" bgcolor=gray align="center" |
|align=left|Independents
|123,351||2.29||0.4||||1,234||225||||
|-
|style="width: 10px" bgcolor=#000080 align="center" | 
|align=left|National Solidarity
|21,462||0.40||—||||55||—||||—
|-
| 
|12,490||0.23||—||||38||—||||—
|-
|style="width: 10px" bgcolor=#FF66FF align="center" | 
|align=left|Socialist / People's
|11,913||0.22||0.5|||||124||57||||
|-
|style="width: 10px" bgcolor=#FF66FF align="center" | 
|align=left|PS / CDU / UDP / PDA
|10,593||0.20||—||||80||—||||—
|-
|style="width: 10px" bgcolor=#E2062C align="center" | 
|align=left|People's Democratic Union
|7,639||0.14||0.4||||2||28||||
|-
| 
|3,820||0.07||0.0||||1||1||||
|-
| 
|1,525||0.03||0.6|||||10||48||||
|-
| 
|1,163||0.02||0.2|||||8||5||||
|-
| 
|306||0.01||0.0||||2||7||||
|-
|  
|77||0.00||—||||0||—||||—
|-
|colspan=2 align=left style="background-color:#E9E9E9"|Total valid
|width="65" align="right" style="background-color:#E9E9E9"|5,197,642
|width="40" align="right" style="background-color:#E9E9E9"|96.49
|width="40" align="right" style="background-color:#E9E9E9"|0.1
|width="40" align="right" style="background-color:#E9E9E9"|—
|width="45" align="right" style="background-color:#E9E9E9"|33,458
|width="45" align="right" style="background-color:#E9E9E9"|458
|width="45" align="right" style="background-color:#E9E9E9"|
|width="45" align="right" style="background-color:#E9E9E9"|
|-
|colspan=2|Blank ballots
|99,518||1.85||0.0||colspan=6 rowspan=4|
|-
|colspan=2|Invalid ballots
|89,490||1.66||0.1
|-
|colspan=2 align=left style="background-color:#E9E9E9"|Total
|width="65" align="right" style="background-color:#E9E9E9"|5,386,650
|width="40" align="right" style="background-color:#E9E9E9"|100.00
|width="40" align="right" style="background-color:#E9E9E9"|
|-
|colspan=2|Registered voters/turnout
||8,530,297||63.15||7.9
|-
| colspan=11 align=left | Source: Comissão Nacional de Eleições 
|}

See also
 Politics of Portugal
 List of political parties in Portugal
 Elections in Portugal

References

External links
 Official results site, Portuguese Justice Ministry
 Portuguese Electoral Commission

1993 elections in Portugal
1993
December 1993 events in Europe